The 1964 GP Ouest-France was the 28th edition of the GP Ouest-France cycle race and was held on 1 September 1964. The race started and finished in Plouay. The race was won by Jean Bourlès.

General classification

References

1964
1964 in road cycling
1964 in French sport